The Jim Clark Rally is a round on the British Rally Championship calendar, named after 1963 and 1965 Formula One champion Jim Clark. It has been a prominent feature of the BRC calendar since its debut in the series in 1999, and was started in 1970.

The 2014 rally was stopped after the deaths of three spectators, and cancelled for 2015. The organisers announced in November 2015 that the event would be reinstated for 2016 in some form. It was cancelled in 2016 however, due to low entries. The Motor Sports Authority refused the rally a permit for 2017.

Events
Jim Clark Rally:
31 May/1 June, round three and the first asphalt event of the 2013 MSA British Rally Championship, featuring 130 stage and 250 road miles.

Jim Clark Challenge Rally:
31 May/ 1 June, round three, the first asphalt event of the 2013 NGK Spark Plugs BRC Challenge, features approx 75 stage and 130 road miles.

Recce dates: Either Sun 26 May or Thurs 30 May for both Championships
Shakedown date / time: Friday 31 May 10am to 12 am
Start location: Duns Town Centre on Friday evening for both.
Finish Location: Kelso Town Centre on Sat afternoon for BRCC and teatime for BRC
Rally Guide 1 issue date: February 2013
Scrutineering: Friday morning
Service Area Location(s): Kelso HQ Service Area with remote for BRC only in Duns

Features of the event:

Only mainland UK rally to close public roads
Town centre start and spectator stage in Duns
Podium restart on Saturday in Kelso for leg 2
Return of the sensational Langton water splash stage
Podium finish in Kelso on Saturday for both Championships

Winners

Multiple winners

References

External links
Official Website

British Rally Championship
Scottish Rally Championship